The National Navy of Gabon is the naval branch of the Armed Forces of Gabon. It operates a few fast attack craft and patrol vessels to maintain security along its -long coastline.

Overview 

Created on 16 December 1960, the Gabonese Navy is tasked with controlling the coastal waters of Gabon (-long coast). In 1983, the Navy became independent from the Gabon Army. Its headquarters is in Libreville and its two naval bases are in Port-Gentil and Mayunba.

Gabon has a  coastline along the Atlantic Ocean. The principal port of the nation is in Libreville and Gabon claims a  territorial sea limit and a  exclusive economic zone (EEZ). However, jurisdiction over the EEZ is in flux as the limits have not been defined, overlapping with Annobón which belongs to Equatorial Guinea and São Tomé and Príncipe.

List of ships of the Gabon Navy
The Gabon Navy primarily utilises fast attack craft and patrol vessels to monitor its coastal waters.

 , a 
 , a P400-class patrol vessel
 , a fast attack craft that entered service in 1978.
 , a BATRAL landing ship

Also, two French-built Kership offshore patrol vessels are on order.

References 

Gabon
Gabon